Keenan Almeida (born 10 December 1991) is an Indian professional footballer who plays as a right back in I-League for Churchill Brothers.

Career
Born in Margao, Goa, Almeida started his career with Salgaocar in both the I-League and Goa Professional League. Due to lack of playing time, before the 2012–13 season, Almeida signed for Sporting Goa. However, it would not be until the 2013–14 season when Almeida would make his debut for the club. It occurred on 23 November 2013 when Sporting Goa took on eventual champions, Bengaluru FC, at the Bangalore Football Stadium. He started the match and played the full 90 as it ended 0–0.

FC Goa
After failing to get regular playing time at Sporting Goa, Almeida signed for FC Goa of the Indian Super League on 18 July 2015.

On 11 March 2016, Keenan was resigned by FC Goa for 2016 Indian Super League season. He played 7 times for the club in the season but could not help his team qualify for the semi-finals.

Churchill Brothers (loan)
He was signed on loan by the newly re-instated I-League club Churchill Brothers for the 2016–17 I-League season. He would make 17 appearances in the league for his team as they finish a respectable 6th.

International
After being a regular for Sporting Goa during the 2013–14 I-League season, Almeida was selected for the India U23 side that would participate at the 2014 Asian Games in South Korea.

Career statistics

Honours

Club

Chennaiyin FC
 Indian Super League: 2017–18

Personal life
He is married to Liza Araujo since 28 December 2019.

References

1991 births
Living people
People from Margao
Indian footballers
India youth international footballers
Salgaocar FC players
Sporting Clube de Goa players
FC Goa players
Association football defenders
Footballers from Goa
I-League players
Goa Professional League players
Footballers at the 2014 Asian Games
Asian Games competitors for India
Indian Super League players
Churchill Brothers FC Goa players
Chennaiyin FC players
FC Pune City players
Hyderabad FC players
Mumbai City FC players